Iron Mountain may refer to:

Places

Czech Republic
Ranges
 Iron Mountains (Czech Republic) / Železné hory, a mountain ridge in Chrudim District in the middle of Czech Republic

United States
Communities
 Iron Mountain, Michigan, a city
 Iron Mountain, Missouri, a community and historic mining area in St. Francois County
 Farthing, Wyoming, also known as Iron Mountain
 Iron Mountains (California)
 Camp Iron Mountain California

Mines
 Iron Mountain Mine, a toxic mine and Superfund site near Redding, California
 Iron Mountain District, a series of magnetite and hematite deposits in southwestern Utah

Summits
 Iron Mountain (Los Angeles County), California
 Iron Mountain (Madera County, California)
 Iron Mountain (Napa County, California)
 Iron Mountain (Sangre de Cristo Range), southern Colorado
 Iron Mountain (Never Summer Mountains), northern Colorado
 Iron Mountain (Florida)
 Iron Mountain (Idaho)
 Iron Mountain (Oregon)
 Iron Mountain (South Dakota)
 Iron Mountain (Utah)
 Iron Mountain (Jefferson County, Washington), Olympic Mountains
 Iron Mountain (Pierce County, Washington), Mount Rainier National Park

Ranges
 Iron Mountains, a sub-range of the Appalachian Mountains in Tennessee, Virginia, and North Carolina
 Iron Mountains (California), in the Mojave Desert

Other uses
 Iron Mountain (company), specializing in records management
 Iron Mountain (riverboat), a Mississippi riverboat
 The Report from Iron Mountain, an alleged hoax on think tanks and war planning
 Pine Mountain Jump, site of the Iron Mountain leg of the FIS Ski Jumping World Cup

See also
 Iron Hill (disambiguation)
 Ore Mountains (disambiguation)